Pasefid (also Romanized as Pāsefīd) is a village in Jaghin-e Shomali Rural District, Jaghin District, Rudan County, Hormozgan Province, Iran. At the 2006 census, its population was 1,041, in 213 families.

References 

Populated places in Rudan County